Isola Sant'Andrea Lighthouse is an active lighthouse located on  a flat islet, the Isola Sant'Andrea, positioned at  from Gallipoli on the Ionian Sea.

Description
The lighthouse is completely automated and is managed by the Marina Militare with the identification code number 3562 E.F.

See also
 List of lighthouses in Italy
 Gallipoli

References

External links
 Servizio Fari Marina Militare

Lighthouses in Italy
Lighthouses completed in 1865
Buildings and structures in the Province of Lecce